On June 22, 1951, Pan Am Flight 151, flown by the Lockheed L-049 Constellation propliner Clipper Great Republic (registration ) crashed into a West African hill at an elevation of  near the village of Sanoyie in Bong County, Liberia.  All 31 passengers and nine crew on board were killed.

Sequence of events
The Johannesburg to New York City flight was on the Accra, Gold Coast (now Ghana), to Monrovia, Liberia leg of its journey.  At 0301h during a pre-dawn approach to Monrovia's Robertsfield Airport, the flight crew reported to the tower that the radio beacon at Dakar, Senegal was interfering with the Robertsfield radio beacon. After a 0315h weather report was sent to the pilots, all contact with the aircraft was lost. The flight was reported missing at 0410h on June 22, and an aerial search was conducted, but it was unsuccessful in locating the aircraft. At 1430h on June 23, a foot messenger arrived from the village of Sanoyie to report that an aircraft crashed into the side of a hill one day earlier several miles from the village and that everyone aboard was killed.

Investigation
It was determined that the location where the flight crashed was beyond the effective range of the Robertsfield beacon. This, combined with the report from the crew that the Dakar beacon was interfering with the Robertsfield beacon, resulted in the frequency of the Robertsfield beacon being changed to provide greater separation of frequencies between the two beacons. Investigation of the wreckage revealed no indications of mechanical malfunction, the aircraft had enough fuel for another eight hours of flight, the weight and disposition of the payload was within allowable limits, and the weather was above minima.

The Civil Aeronautics Board investigation concluded that the probable cause of the accident was the action of the captain in descending below his en route minimum altitude without positive identification of the flight's position.

Notes

References

External links
 
 Report from the Civil Aeronautics Board (Archive)

1951 in Liberia
Aviation accidents and incidents in 1951
Aviation accidents and incidents in Liberia
Airliner accidents and incidents caused by pilot error
Aviation accidents and incidents involving controlled flight into terrain
Accidents and incidents involving the Lockheed Constellation
151
Bong County
June 1951 events in Africa